Georges Julien Paul (born 7 January 1996) is a Mauritian badminton player. Paul took part at the 2014 African Youth Games, and won three gold medals in the individual event. He was part of the national team that won the gold medal at the 2015 African Games. Paul won the men's singles title at the 2018 and 2020 African Championships.

He competed at the 2014, 2018 and 2022 Commonwealth Games. Paul won a gold medal in the men's doubles, a silver in the singles, and a bronze in the mixed doubles at the 2019 African Games.

Achievements

African Games 
Men's singles

Men's doubles

Mixed doubles

African Championships 
Men's singles

Men's doubles

Mixed doubles

African Youth Games 
Boys' singles

Boys' doubles

Mixed doubles

BWF International Challenge/Series (6 titles, 14 runners-up) 
Men's singles

Men's doubles

Mixed doubles

  BWF International Challenge tournament
  BWF International Series tournament
  BWF Future Series tournament

References

External links
 
 

1996 births
Living people
People from Plaines Wilhems District
Mauritian male badminton players
Badminton players at the 2020 Summer Olympics
Olympic badminton players of Mauritius
Badminton players at the 2014 Commonwealth Games
Badminton players at the 2018 Commonwealth Games
Badminton players at the 2022 Commonwealth Games
Commonwealth Games competitors for Mauritius
Competitors at the 2015 African Games
Competitors at the 2019 African Games
African Games gold medalists for Mauritius
African Games silver medalists for Mauritius
African Games bronze medalists for Mauritius
African Games medalists in badminton